The International Society of Automation (ISA), formerly known as The Instrumentation, Systems, and Automation Society, is a non-profit technical society for engineers, technicians, businesspeople, educators and students, who work, study or are interested in automation and pursuits related to it, such as instrumentation. It was originally known as the Instrument Society of America. The society is more commonly known by its acronym, ISA, and the society's scope now includes many technical and engineering disciplines.
ISA is one of the foremost professional organizations in the world for setting standards and educating industry professionals in automation. Instrumentation and automation are some of the key technologies involved in nearly all industrialized manufacturing. Modern industrial manufacturing is a complex interaction of numerous systems. Instrumentation provides regulation for these complex systems using many different measurement and control devices. Automation provides the programmable devices that permit greater flexibility in the operation of these complex manufacturing systems.

In 2019, ISA announced the formation of the ISA Global Cybersecurity Alliance to promote the ISA/IEC 62443 series of standards, which are the world’s only consensus-based cybersecurity standard for automation and control system applications.

Structure
The International Society of Automation is a non-profit member-driven organization, which is built on a backbone of volunteers. Volunteers, working together with the ISA's full-time staff of over 75, are key to the ongoing mission and success of the organization. The ISA has a strong leadership development program that develops volunteer leaders as they get involved with the organization's many different facets. ISA has several different ways that volunteers get involved from the section, division, and standards roots of the organization.

ISA members are typically assigned an ISA Section (local chapter) which is related to their geographic location. Members can then join ISA Divisions which correspond to their individual technical interests. ISA Standards Committees are open to both ISA members and non-members to become involved with.

In addition to the member-driven aspects of the ISA, the organization itself is divided into departments headed by a director. These departments are:

 Education, Training & Publications
 Marketing & Graphics
 Membership
 IT
 Sales
 Standards
 Finance
 Customer/Member Service

History
ISA was officially established as the Instrument Society of America on 28 April 1945, in Pittsburgh, Pennsylvania. The society grew out of the desire of 18 local instrument societies to form a national organization. It was the brainchild of Richard Rimbach of the Instruments Publishing Company. Rimbach is recognized as the founder of ISA.
Industrial instruments, which became widely used during World War II, continued to play an ever-greater role in the expansion of technology after the war. Individuals like Rimbach and others involved in industry saw a need for the sharing of information about instruments on a national basis, as well as for standards and uniformity. The Instrument Society of America addressed that need.
Albert F. Sperry, chairman of Panelit Corporation, became ISA's first president in 1946. In that same year, the Society held its first conference and exhibit in Pittsburgh. The first standard, RP 5.1 Instrument Flow Plan Symbols, followed in 1949, and the first journal was published in 1954.
In the years following, ISA continued to expand its products and services, increasing the size and scope of the ISA conference and exhibition, developing symposia, offering professional development and training, adding technical Divisions, and even producing films about measurement and control.

Membership grew from 900 in 1946 to 6,900 in 1953, and as of 2019, ISA members number approximately 32,000 from over 100 countries.

In 1980, ISA moved its headquarters to Research Triangle Park (RTP), North Carolina, and a training center was established in nearby Raleigh. In 1997, the headquarters and training center were consolidated in a new building in RTP, where the society's day-to-day activities are managed by a professional staff of approximately 75.

Recognizing the fact that ISA's technical scope had grown beyond instruments and that its reach went beyond "America", in the fall of 2000 the ISA Council of Society Delegates approved a legal name change to ISA—The Instrumentation, Systems, and Automation Society. Today, ISA's corporate branding strategy focuses exclusively on the letters, though ISA's official, legal name remains the same.

In recent years, ISA has assumed a more global orientation, hiring multilingual staff and a director of global operations, chartering new sections in several countries outside the United States and Canada, issuing publications in Spanish, and in 2002 ISA elected its first president from outside North America.

On October 2, 2007, the Council of Society Delegates deliberated a proposal to change the society's legal name to "International Society of Automation". A majority vote favored the action. However, since the 2/3 majority required for a bylaw, change was not achieved, the proposal was not adopted.

On October 13, 2008, the Council of Society Delegates deliberated a proposal to change the society's legal name to "International Society of Automation". The majority vote favored the action and the proposal was adopted.

Membership
ISA membership is organized into particular grades: Honorary, Fellow, Senior Member, Member, and Student Member. Honorary membership is conferred only upon those individuals who have made noteworthy contributions to the profession and does not require payment of dues. Professional members pay dues of $100 per year, and student dues are $10 annually. Members in certain countries with lower per capita GDP (relative to US & Europe) may pay dues at a reduced rate, and a grade of "virtual member", with very limited benefits is available for annual dues of $5 to students in certain circumstances. After 25 years of membership and satisfaction of an age requirement, members are eligible to become Life Members and exempt from dues payment.

The benefits of ISA membership include, among other things, affiliation with an ISA section (see below), a subscription to the ISA's bimonthly flagship magazine InTech, discounts on ISA's products, events and services, and the privilege of viewing ISA standards, recommended practices, and technical papers at no extra charge.

In 2012, ISA introduced a free membership program called an Automation Community Member.

Sections and districts
Local ISA chapters are known as ISA Sections. A "regular" section consists of at least 30 members (not including student members). Sections are commonly organized around a specific geographic area, e.g. Seattle Section, Connecticut Valley Section, Greater Oklahoma Section, France Section etc. There are nearly 170 chartered sections in around 30 countries in North America, South America, Europe, Asia, and the Middle East. Sections are separately incorporated, according to the laws of the state, province or other political subdivision in which they are located. They are not units of ISA, although their bylaws may not conflict with ISA's. As of 2012, there are 146 sections.

Many sections sponsor training courses, conduct periodic trade shows, and act as a resource to the local industrial community. Reflecting their primacy in ISA's early days, sections retain pre-eminent governance authority, as ISA's legislative body, the Council of Society Delegates, is composed of section representatives (delegates) who hold voting power equal to the size of their membership.

ISA also has nearly 200 student sections, in locations all over the world, principally where the economy has a substantial manufacturing component, and instrumentation and industrial automation are vital academic programs. Some student sections have found it difficult to remain active, as it is necessary to continually replace graduates with newer students, and membership is consequently very fluid.

Sections are located within districts, of which there are 14, and which comprise large geographic areas of the world. Each one is headed by a vice president. Districts 1,2,3,5,6,7,8,9, and 11 are in the US (although District 7 also includes Mexico and Central America, and District 3 includes Puerto Rico). Districts 10 and 13 are in Canada. District 4 is South America (including the Trinidad Section). District 12 is Europe and the Middle East, and District 14 is the Asia-Pacific sphere. ISA formerly had geographic subdivisions known as "regions", which were part of the short lived "ISA International" (1988–1996). At varying intervals following the disestablishment of ISA International, the European Region became District 12, the India Region became District 14, and the South America Region became District 4 .

Technical divisions
ISA's 16 technical divisions, established for the purpose of increased information exchange within tightly focused segments of the fields of instrumentation, systems, and automation are organized under the Automation & Technology or Industries & Sciences Departments, depending upon the nature of the division.

The ISA Technical Divisions are:
 Aerospace / Test Measurement Division
 Analysis Division
 Automatic Controls and Robotics Division
 Automation Project Management and Delivery Division
 Building Automation Systems Division
 Chemical and Petroleum Industries Division
 Construction and Design Division
 Education and Research Division
 Food and Pharmaceutical Industries Division
 Mining and Metals Industries Division
 Power Industry Division
 Process Measurement and Control Division
 Pulp and Paper Industry Division
 Safety and Security Division
 Smart Manufacturing and IIoT Division
 Water and Wastewater Industries Division

Standards
ISA standards play a major role in the work of instrumentation and automation professionals. Many ISA standards have been recognized by the American National Standards Institute (ANSI). Many ISA standards have also been adopted as international standards by the International Electrotechnical Commission (IEC).

ISA standards cover a wide range of concepts of importance to instrumentation and automation professionals. ISA has standards committees for symbols and nomenclature used within the industry, safety standards for equipment in non-hazardous and hazardous environments, communications standards to permit interoperable equipment availability from several manufacturers, and additional committees for standards on many more technical issues of importance to the industry. An example of one significant ISA standard is the ANSI/ISA-50.02 Fieldbus Standard for Use in Industrial Control Systems, which is a product of the ISA-50 Signal Compatibility of Electrical Instruments committee. Another significant ISA standard family is the batch processing standards of ANSI/ISA-88.00.01 Models and Terminology, ANSI/ISA-88.00.02 Data Structures and Guidelines for Languages, and ANSI/ISA-88.00.03 General and Site Recipe Models and Representation, which are products of the ISA-88 Batch Control committee.

Other standards developed by ISA include:

ISA100.11a is for testing and certification of wireless products and systems. This standard was approved by the International Electrotechnical Commission (IEC) as a publicly available specification, or PAS in September 2011.

ISA95 is an international standard for developing an automated interface between enterprise and control systems.

As of 2012, the Society has over 162 published standards, recommended practices, and technical reports.

Cyber Security Standards for Industrial Control Systems
The International Society of Automation also produces the ISA99 standard which is one of the important Cyber security standards. The cyber security of private industries and governmental installations dependent on the reliable functioning of an Industrial control system is a highly debated subject, that has considerable importance for the security of the critical infrastructure of any country. For example: International Society of Automation cyber security standards are mentioned on the United States Computer Emergency Response Team website.

The ISA has formed the ISA Security Compliance Institute  to promote and designate cyber-secure products and practices for industrial automation suppliers and operational sites.

Standards committees
ISA standards are developed using a consensus-based model employing volunteer standards committees of automation professionals from across industries. The ANSI standards development model is used with standards committees having the characteristics of Openness, Lack of Dominance, Balance, Consensus and a Right of Appeal. All ISA standards processes are overseen by the ISA Standards & Practices Board.

As of 2012, there are more than 3500 participating individuals on ISA standards committees, from over 40 countries, and representing more than 2000 companies and organizations.

Conferences, symposia and shows

Division symposia
ISA also holds both industry and technology-specific symposia on a wide variety of topics.

Local section events
ISA Sections will often host their own local trade shows called Section Expos, member events, and/or sponsored training in their individual geographic areas.

Publishing

Periodicals
ISA's technical magazine is one of the benefits of ISA membership. InTech circulation includes all 31,000 ISA members, as well as several thousand other recipients, who are classified as "qualified" subscribers. Total circulation is about 60,000 in print and a further 40,000 through the web-based digital edition.

The quarterly publication ISA Transactions, published by Elsevier, is a referred journal of scholarly material, for which the intended audience is research and development personnel from academy and industry in the field of process instrumentation, systems, and automation.

ISA formerly published Industrial Computing, of the now-inactive Industrial Computing Society as well as Motion Control, a magazine devoted to professionals in this discipline. Although the print version was discontinued in 2001, it continued online for a period of time.

Books
ISA publishes and distributes books which offer thorough coverage of the world of automation. ISA books are organized by the technical categories which are generally considered as defining automation:
 Basic continuous control
 Basic discrete, sequencing and manufacturing control
 Advanced control
 Reliability, safety, and electrical
 Integration and software
 Deployment and maintenance
 Work structure

Standards
The ISA publishes its standards, recommended practices and technical reports in a variety of formats. These include printed hardcopy, downloadable PDF, web-based viewable, CDROM/DVD and network licenses.

Training, certification and education

Training
ISA training products include classroom-based training, mobile training courses, in-plant training, online courses, and printed course materials. The ISA also provides in-house training for a number of large corporations in the oil/gas and chemical industries.

Technical papers archive
The ISA has an online, searchable collection of technical papers which are available to ISA members and to digital library subscribers. As of 2012, the library has over 3000 technical papers.

Certification programs
ISA manages two certification programs, Certified Automation Professional (CAP), and Certified Control Systems Technician (CCST). Each of these is designed to be an objective, third-party assessment and confirmation of an individual's professional abilities and technical skills. Each certification is granted based on a combination of formal education/training, professional experience, and performance on a written examination.

The CCST program was established in the early 1990s and because of an obvious industry need, rapidly gained credibility. There are now approximately 4,000 ISA certified technicians worldwide.

The CAP program, launched in 2004, is still in the process of becoming established within the industrial community and gaining recognition. As of 2012, there are over 500 certified CAPs worldwide.

The ISA used to have a third certification program called Certified Industrial Maintenance Mechanic (CIMM) which was established in 2004. In 2010, the CIMM program was transferred to the Society for Maintenance and Reliability Professionals. The SMRP renamed the CIMM certification to the Certified Maintenance and Reliability Technician (CMRT).

References

International organizations based in the United States
Organizations based in North Carolina
Engineering organizations
Standards organizations in the United States
Industrial automation